The eighth South American Junior Championships in Athletics were held in Cali, Colombia, at the Estadio Olímpico Pascual Guerrero between October 9–12, 1970.

Participation (unofficial)
Detailed result lists can be found on the "World Junior Athletics History" website.  An unofficial count yields the number of about 194 athletes from about 9 countries:  Argentina (35), Brazil (30), Chile (29), Colombia (33), Ecuador (16), Paraguay (2), Peru (21), Uruguay (5), Venezuela (23).

Medal summary
Medal winners are published for men and women
Complete results can be found on the "World Junior Athletics History" website.

Men

* = another source rather states: Hexathlon

Women

Medal table (unofficial)

References

External links
World Junior Athletics History

South American U20 Championships in Athletics
1970 in Colombian sport
South American U20 Championships
1970 in South American sport
International athletics competitions hosted by Colombia
1970 in youth sport